= Chak Gharpur =

Village in Uttar Pradesh, India

Prayagraj

Chak Gharpur is a village in Prayagraj, Uttar Pradesh, India.
